The Indianapolis mayoral election of 1925 took place on November 3, 1925 and saw the election of Republican former Marion County treasurer John L. Duvall, who defeated Democratic former Indianapolis city attorney Walter Meyers.

The 1925 municipal elections were notable for the presence of the Ku Klux Klan. John L. Duvall was a member of the Klan. However, contemporarily, the election was considered to one of the most tame municipal elections in then-recent memory.

Nominations
Walter Meyers defeated A.G. Emhardt for the Democratic nomination.

Duvall, a Klansman, defeated anti-Klan candidate Ralph Lemcke for the Republican nomination.

Results
Duvall won roughly 52,000 votes to Myers' roughly 43,000 votes.

Duvall carried every ward except the city's 12th and 13th wards. Despite his being a Klansman, Duvall's victory was, in part, due to his carrying the predominantly African American 5th and 6th wards. Duvall, despite winning, underperformed in many wards compared to down-ticket Republicans.

Voter turnout was considered to be low, with only 95,872 out of an estimated 150,000 registered voters participating in the municipal election.

In the coinciding city council elections, which were voted at-large, six out of nine city council members elected were also pro-Klan Republicans. Additionally, the Klan-backed "United Protestant" slate won in the city's coinciding school board elections.

References

1925
1925 United States mayoral elections
1925 Indiana elections